Klingenbach is a river of Bavaria, Germany. It is a right tributary to the Flutgraben, the man-made lower course of the Goldbach, in Aschaffenburg.

See also
List of rivers of Bavaria

Rivers of Bavaria
Rivers of the Spessart
Rivers of Germany